Abdul Razzaq (Punjabi, ; born 2 December 1979) is a Pakistani cricket coach and former  cricketer, who played all formats of the game. He is a right arm fast-medium bowler and a right-handed batsman, who emerged in international cricket in 1996 with his One Day International debut against Zimbabwe at his home ground in Gaddafi Stadium, Lahore; just one month before his seventeenth birthday. He was the part of the Pakistan Cricket Team squad that won the ICC World Twenty20 2009. He played 265 ODIs and 46 Tests.

At the age of 38, Abdul Razzaq announced that he would make a comeback in domestic circuit level to play first-class cricket again after having short stints as a coach for few domestic teams in Pakistan since his international retirement in 2013.

Personal life
Abdul Razzaq was born in Shahdara Bagh, a suburb on the outskirts of Lahore, Punjab, known for its Mughal architecture.

He is married to Ayesha.

His son Ali Razzaq is also a cricketer.

International career

Early career
Razzaq made his One Day International debut in November 1996, against Zimbabwe, but had to wait just over three years to make his Test cricket debut for Pakistan, eventually doing so against Australia in Brisbane in November 1999. In the 1999–2000 Carlton and United Series, he rose to fame and was named man of the series for his all round performance. During a match in Hobart against India, Razzaq scored a half century and took five wickets. In the same tournament, he hit former Australian fast bowler, Glenn McGrath for 5 fours, which totalled to 20 runs in one over.
Razzaq also performed well with the ball, his most noticeable stint was in the Coca-Cola Champions Trophy 1999 against Sri Lanka in Sharjah, October 1999. Pakistan were bowled out for 196, with Razzaq remaining not out on 7. However, Razzaq proved to be more than capable with his all round skills as he took his first five wicket haul, dismissing Romesh Kaluwitharana, Mahela Jayawardene, Suresh Perera, Chaminda Vaas and Chamara Silva to finish with match figures of 5/31, meaning that Sri Lanka were also bowled out for 196 resulting in a tied match, having once been at 157/2. Former captain Wasim Akram praised Razzaq's ability with the ball, citing that he was emerging to be one of the best all rounders in the world. Razzaq's astonishing nine-ball spell, which he took four for nought helped snatch a tie from what seemed a certain Sri Lankan victory, finishing as the man of the match for his performance.

1999 Cricket World Cup
Razzaq became a regular member of his national side during the 1999 world cup held in England. During the event, he got the attention of selectors as he performed well both with the ball and bat. His brilliant performance with the bat came in the group match against Australia, where he went on to score his first half century making 60 runs in a long and stable partnership with Inzamam-ul-Haq, which helped Pakistan reach a defendable target of 275. Pakistan went on to win the match by ten runs and as a result qualified for the Super Six stage. With the ball, he made a brilliant performance against the tough West Indies national cricket team by taking three wickets for 32 runs having three maiden overs, which proved decisive for Pakistan at Bristol.

2000 Carlton and United Series
Razzaq's other impressive performances came during the Carlton & United Series at Australia in a tri-nation tournament involving Pakistan, Australia and India in 2000. Razzaq achieved the man of the series award for his best all round performances, especially in a pre-finals match against India, where he scored 70 not out with the bat and took 5 wickets for 48 runs, thus becoming the fifth all-rounder to have scored a half century and take five wickets in an ODI; the other four players being Vivian Richards, Kris Srikkanth, Mark Waugh, and Lance Klusener. Shahid Afridi subsequently achieved the feat thrice for Pakistan.

In the first match of the series against Australia, he took 4 wickets and played an important role for Pakistan helping them to successfully defend a very low target of 184 runs at Brisbane. In the third match of the series, Razzaq came into prominence after hitting five consecutive boundaries in the fifth over of Australian pacer Glenn McGrath. Eventually Pakistan was defeated in the finals by Australia but Razzaq was named player of the series for his all-round performance.

Prominence
In 2000, Razzaq became the youngest cricketer in the world to take a Test cricket hat-trick in a match against Sri Lanka. He has scored three centuries and twenty two fifties in One Day International matches. His highest score was 112 runs, against South Africa in 2002, where he shared a partnership of 257 runs with Pakistani batsman Saleem Elahi. His second century was scoring 107 runs not out in a match against Zimbabwe in 2004. During this match, he saved Pakistan from a disastrous start and eventually won them the match. His first fifty came in 90 deliveries, before accelerating in the second fifty runs, which was scored in just 21 balls. Also in 2003–2004, he scored 89 runs from 40 balls against New Zealand, whose captain Stephen Fleming called him the "best hitter" in the world. In January 2005, he was involved in the ACC Asian XI that took on the ICC World XI in the World Cricket Tsunami Appeal charity match at the Melbourne Cricket Ground in Australia.

As a fast bowler, Razzaq experienced a steady decline in speed and performance during the 2003 cricket World Cup and 2004. Razzaq dropped Tendulkar who later on scored a matchwinning 98(75). During this period, he remained as a supporting bowler. However, from 2005 to the end of 2006, he regained his speed and he won many matches for Pakistan with his bowling. His best bowling figures in a One Day International match is 6 wickets for 35 runs. His another notable performance was against Sri Lanka at Sharjah in 1999, where Pakistan was all out for 196 runs and he took 5 wickets for 31 runs to draw the match. During the 2005–2006 Test match series against India, Razzaq took 9 wickets and scored 205 runs in two Test matches he played, which resulted in an improvement of his performance. His batting remained generally consistent from 2000 to 2006, although his place on the Test team was never secure.

Razzaq's place in the Pakistan national team has been marred by injuries and absences. In 2005 it was revealed that he was suffering from eating too much spinach, which was causing him to suffer from nausea and sickness while playing. This led to him being known as 'Popeye' by his teammates. In 2007, a poor performance in a series with both the bat and ball, in a match against South Africa, accompanied with an injury that forced him out of the 2007 cricket World Cup, had him dropped from the 2007 World Twenty20, a decision that received widespread criticism from cricket individuals.

Temporary retirement in 2007
On 20 August 2007, Razzaq announced his retirement against his omission from the 2007 ICC World Twenty20 squad. However, on 27 October 2007, Razzaq revoked his decision following discussions with his local cricket club and coach, saying, "Maybe I made that (decision to retire) in the heat of the moment."

 He signed up for the Indian Cricket League and played for the Hyderabad Heroes as one of their star players. He eventually severed ties with the league in September 2008 and returned to international cricket in June 2009, helping Pakistan win the 2009 ICC T20 World Cup.

Return in team: 2009 World Twenty20 Championship
In 2009, he was selected into Pakistan's squad for the 2009 ICC World Twenty20 in England as a replacement for injured fast bowler Yasir Arafat, marking his return to International cricket and becoming the first Indian Cricket League player, whose ban was lifted by the Pakistan Cricket Board. He played an important role in Pakistan's victory in the tournament, taking 5 wickets at an average of 14.80 and an economy rate of 5.92. His figures of 3 wickets for 20 runs, played a significant role in Pakistan's victory against Sri Lanka in the final. As a result, he along with another former Indian Cricket League player Mohammad Yousuf were awarded 'A’ category mid-term central contracts by the Pakistan Cricket Board.

In the 2009–2010 season, Razzaq missed out on the tours of New Zealand and Australia, due to injury. However he was selected in the two match Twenty20 International series against England in February 2010. His innings of 46 runs not out from 18 deliveries in the second match of the series, cemented Pakistan a victory, their first in eleven international outings.

On 30 December when playing in a game for the Melbourne Renegades, former Australian cricketer Mark Waugh described Razzaq as a "cardboard cut out" based on his appeared disinterest when playing.

ODI return: against New Zealand
Upon his ODI return, he played a fine little cameo for Pakistan with the bat scoring 23 runs of 20 deliveries and pushed the score to 287. New Zealand needed 288 to win and Razzaq took the key wickets of Scott Styris and Jacob Oram to ensure that Pakistan thrash New Zealand by 141 runs. In the second ODI, he took the wickets of Martin Guptill (62) and Daniel Vettori on (30). Despite this, New Zealand ended the innings at 303/8. Pakistan collapsed to 239 all out, with Razzaq scoring 35 runs. With the series levelled 1–1 Pakistan went into the third ODI and bowled New Zealand out for 211. Despite this Pakistan suffered a top order collapse at 79/7 with Younis Khan, Salman Butt, Khalid Latif, Shoaib Malik, Kamran Akmal, Umar Akmal and Shahid Afridi falling cheaply. The Razzaq came in and registered a duck as he was run out by Vettori. Gul fell cheaply as well but Pakistan still got agonizingly close to victory, when Mohammad Amir and Saeed Ajmal were engaged in a 103 run partnership before Ajmal top edged a pull on the first ball of the last over as Pakistan were seven runs short of victory.

Hand injury: No participation against Australia
Razzaq picked up a hand injury just before the first ODI against Australia and missed the whole five match series and the only Twenty20 match. He was hit on the hand while batting during the practice sessions The series turned out to be a forgettable one of Pakistan as Mohammad Yousuf and Younis Khan received life bans (overturned 2 months later) for inflicting fighting in the team. Also Rana Naved-ul-Hasan was given a one-year ban along with Shoaib Malik being banned for a year all were overturned on appeal. Amid the fighting Pakistan lost the five match series 5–0 and the only Twenty20 match as well.

Top all-round form (2010)
With players like Younis Khan, Mohammad Yousuf and Shoaib Malik suffering from selection issues, it was Razzaq who took up the role of a senior player in the Pakistan cricket team. He was selected in the squad for the 2010 ICC World Twenty20 and performed admirably with the bat scoring five sixes during the tournament. Pakistan crashed out of the tournament after losing to Australia in the semi-final. Razzaq then took part in the 2010 Asia Cup.

In July 2010, Razzaq played in the two T20Is against Australia as Pakistan won both matches comfortably. He wasn't selected for the Test series against Australia and England and next played in the September 2010 Twenty20 and ODI series against England. The Pakistan team had been surrounded by Spot-fixing allegations as the team lost both Twenty20 matches due to low morale. Razzaq missed the first two ODI's against England because of a back-strain as Pakistan lost both matches. He returned to the third ODI and scored 31 runs in a fruitful partnership with Shahid Afridi before Afridi was run out and Razzaq was subsequently caught in the deep square leg as Pakistan were bowled out for 241. England opened the innings strongly before Umar Gul removed six batsmen and Razzaq took two wickets to seal a 23-run victory for Pakistan.

Razzaq's lower order destruction also became helpful for his domestic team the Lahore Lions as he scored 138 runs from his four innings including a superb 73* in the final to help guide his team to victory in the 2010-11 Faysal Bank Twenty-20 Cup.

On 31 October 2010, in the second One Day International against South Africa, Razzaq played a match-winning innings of 109* off 72 balls at a strike rate of 151.38, his third One Day International century. The innings which contained seven fours and ten sixes saw Pakistan to a one-wicket win with one ball remaining and level the 5-match series 1–1.

Series against New Zealand, World Cup Preparation (2011)
Razzaq struggled with the bat in the first two Twenty20's against New Zealand but he did perform admirably with the ball taking out Jesse Ryder for a golden duck in the second Twenty20. During the third match Razzaq blasted 34 off just 11 balls in an innings that included 3 fours and 3 sixes. This innings helped Pakistan push their total onto 184. Razzaq then did the damage with the ball taking the leading run scorer of the series Martin Guptill out for a duck and then took two more top order wickets of Ross Taylor (Leg-before) and clean bowled James Franklin. For this superb all round perform coupled with a 103 run victory for Pakistan Razzaq won man of the match. However two early losses in the series meant New Zealand won the series 2–1.

2011 Cricket World Cup
Razzaq was included in Pakistan's 15-man squad for the 2011 World Cup hosted by Bangladesh, India, and Sri Lanka between February and April. His role was to open the bowling and bat down the order. In his first two matches, he had faced just 10 balls, however he scored 20 not out from 24 balls against Australia to guide Pakistan to victory, ending Australia's string of 34 matches in World Cups without defeat.

Domestic career

Indian Cricket League
In 2007–2008, he played in the Indian Cricket League, playing for Hyderabad Heroes. His excellent performance in the last over during the Indian Cricket League final, allowed his team to take a 1–0 lead in the best of three finals. The finals were eventually won by Hyderabad Heroes, 2–0. During this time, his international career remained in doubt, as the Pakistan Cricket Board had banned players who participated in the unofficial league.

After playing for two seasons, he departed from the Indian Cricket League to be selected and play for the Pakistan national team, saying that he hoped the Pakistan Cricket Board's ban on Indian Cricket League players would soon be revoked and that he has a desire to play for Pakistan national team once again, affirming that his retirement was not necessarily a permanent decision.

England County Cricket
He has also played at the English county level for Middlesex, Worcestershire and Surrey. He joined Surrey in June 2008 on a short-term contract to play in the Twenty20 Cup. He helped Surrey win against Sussex by scoring 39 runs from 19 balls. Despite his short period at The Oval, Razzaq became a favourite player amongst Surrey supporters.

In March 2010 Razzaq signed for Hampshire County Cricket Club as one of their four overseas players for the English domestic Twenty20 competition. He played a starring role in their victory against Somerset on finals day at Hampshire's home ground, the Rose Bowl.

Razzaq signed for Leicestershire County Cricket Club as their second overseas players for the English domestic Friends Life t20. At the 2011 Friends Life t20 he again played for the winning team, this time as a Leicestershire player, against Somerset on the finals day. He also played in both Leicestershire's games in the Champions League T20s, but was unable to help Leicestershire through the qualification stage. He has signed for Staffordshire club Hem Heath for the 2014 Season.

Coaching career
At domestic level, Razzaq was appointed head coach to Khyber Pakhtunkhwa, and under him the team won the Quaid-e-Azam Trophy, National T20 Cup and Pakistan Cup in the 2020-21 season, later he became the head coach of Central Punjab for the 2021-22 domestic season.

Razzaq was appointed as the interim head coach of the Pakistan national team alongside Saqlain Mushtaq on 6 September 2021 by PCB for New Zealand tour of Pakistan 2021, after Misbah-ul-Haq and Waqar Younis stepped down as coaches, but the series later got called off.

In September 2022, he was appointed head coach to the Hyderabad Hunters squad for the inaugural season of the Pakistan Junior League.

International record

Test cricket
Test Debut vs Australia in Brisbane in 1999–2000.
Best Test batting score of 134 runs was made against Bangladesh in Dhaka in 2001–2002.
Best Test bowling figures of 5 wickets for 35 runs came against Sri Lanka in Karachi in 2004–2005.
He took his first Test Hat-trick vs Sri Lanka in Galle International Stadium in 2000.

One Day International
One Day International debut vs Zimbabwe in Lahore in 1996–1997.
Best One Day International batting score of 112 runs was made against South Africa in Port Elizabeth in 2002–2003.
Best One Day International bowling figures of 6 wickets for 35 runs came against Bangladesh in Dhaka in 2001–2002.
Best 7th wicket score (109 from 72 balls) against South Africa in Abu-Dhabi in October 2010

Achievements
 He is one of 53 players, including 8 who have represented Pakistan, who have achieved the double of 1,000 Test runs and 100 Test wickets.
 He is the youngest bowler to take a hat-trick, against Sri Lanka in 2000, at the age of 20.
 Has Batted at every position from an opener to No.11
 In 2009 he along with  Nasir Jamshed set the highest 3rd wicket partnership ever in any forms of T20s (162)

References

External links 
 
 
 Abdul Razzaq at Howstat.com.au
 Abdul Razzaq at Facebook.com

1979 births
Living people
ACC Asian XI One Day International cricketers
Khan Research Laboratories cricketers
Lahore cricketers
Middlesex cricketers
Worcestershire cricketers
Surrey cricketers
Pakistan International Airlines cricketers
Pakistani Muslims
Pakistan One Day International cricketers
Pakistan Test cricketers
Cricketers at the 1999 Cricket World Cup
Cricketers at the 2003 Cricket World Cup
Cricketers at the 2007 Cricket World Cup
Cricketers at the 2011 Cricket World Cup
Pakistan Twenty20 International cricketers
Test cricket hat-trick takers
ICL Pakistan XI cricketers
Hyderabad Heroes cricketers
Hampshire cricketers
Leicestershire cricketers
Melbourne Renegades cricketers
Pakistani cricketers
Lahore City cricketers
Lahore Blues cricketers
Sialkot Stallions cricketers
Rajshahi Royals cricketers
Wayamba United cricketers
Zarai Taraqiati Bank Limited cricketers
Cricketers from Lahore
Lahore Qalandars cricketers
Pakistani cricket captains
Abahani Limited cricketers
Pakistani cricket coaches
People from Lahore